Mimolaia cleroides is a species of beetle in the family Cerambycidae. It was described by Bates in 1866. It is known from Brazil.

Beetles are insects whose larvae and adults have very different morphologies (unlike bedbugs for example). Their fore wings are transformed into a case to protect the hind wings which are stored underneath, folded in two thanks to a joint in the middle of this wing, a joint which does not exist in any other order of insect. Adult beetles are characterized by chewing mouthparts, antennae (usually 11 segments) and a heavily hardened cuticle. The larvae are generally vermiform, soft, with very varied diets or motility. The beetles are the order with the largest number of described species. This is estimated at 387,000 species. Thus, one in four animal species in the world is a beetle.

References

Calliini
Beetles described in 1866